Hubbardston is the name of two towns in the United States:

Hubbardston, Massachusetts
Hubbardston, Michigan

See also
 Hubbardton, Vermont